Grandview Cemetery may refer to several cemeteries in the United States:
 Grandview Cemetery (Chillicothe, Ohio)
 Grandview Cemetery, Fort Collins, Colorado
 Grandview Cemetery, Johnstown, Pennsylvania
 Grand View Burial Park, Hannibal, Missouri
 Grand View Memorial Park Cemetery, Glendale, California

See also 
 Grandview (disambiguation)